The 95th district of the Texas House of Representatives contains a portion of Tarrant county. The current Representative is Nicole Collier, who was first elected in 2012.

References 

95